Felicia brevifolia is an evergreen, richly branched shrub of up to 1 m (5 ft) high, that is assigned to the family Asteraceae. The flower heads have about fifteen blue-violet ray florets, encircling many yellow disc florets. This species grows in southern Namibia and the west of South Africa.

Description 
Felicia brevifolia is an evergreen, upright, up to 1 m (5 ft) high shrub, very woody and leafless at the base, covered in a fibrous, gray-brown bark. The older shoots support dense-leaved short shoots, and are topped by young long shoots. The surface of the leaves may be carry short bristles, or bristles and glandular hairs, or is felty gray-green. The uppermost leaves are small, lance-shaped and entire.

The involucre is up to 1 cm (0.6 in) in diameter and consists of three to four rows of bracts. In the center of each corolla are five anthers merged into a tube, through which the style grows when the floret opens, hoovering up the pollen on its shaft. At the tip of both style branches is a narrowly triangular appendage. Very rarely with a few short (0.2 to 0.3 mm long) basal scales represent short pappus.

Taxonomy 
As far as known, this species of daisy was first collected by Johann Franz Drège in 1835 at Zilverfontein in Namaqualand. In 1836, the species was described by Augustin Pyramus de Candolle, who named it Agathaea brevifolia, but in the same publication also described Felicia dregei β dentata, bases on another specimen collected by Drège. In 1865, William Henry Harvey regarded De Candole's first name no more than a variety and made the combination Aster scabridus var. brevifolius, and reassigned De Candole's second name to Aster, creating Aster dregei var. dentata. in 1932, German botanist, and explorer in South West Africa, Kurt Dinter described Aster grossedentatus based on a specimen he found in 1929 in Great Namaland in the !Karas Region of Namibia. It was reassigned as Felicia grossedentata by mr. P. Range in 1936. Jürke Grau in 1973 considered all these name synonymous and this made it necessary to create the combination Felicia brevifolia. The species is considered part of the section Lignofelicia.

Distribution 
Felicia brevifolia can be found in two larger isolated populations, one between to the east of Lüderitz in Namibia, and in Namaqualand in South Africa.

Conservation 
The continued survival of Felicia brevifolia is considered to be of least concern because its population is stable.

References

External links 
 photos on iNaturalist
 line drawing
 distribution map

brevifolia
Flora of Southern Africa
Plants described in 1836